Seidu Faisal (born 16 June 2002) is a Ghanaian footballer who currently plays as a defender for Ghana Premier League side WAFA.

Career 
Faisal started his career with West African Football Academy, he was promoted to the senior team in January 2018. He made his debut during  2020–21 season. on 20 February 2020, after coming on in the 57th minute for Haruna Jalilu Mola in a 1–0 away loss against International Allies. On 11 July 2020, in a 2–0 victory against Karela United, he came on the late minutes to make a cameo appearance.

References

External links 
 

Living people
2002 births
Association football defenders
Ghanaian footballers
West African Football Academy players
Ghana Premier League players